Josef "Sepp" Holzer (born July 24, 1942 in Ramingstein, State of Salzburg, Austria) is a farmer, an author, and an international consultant for natural agriculture. After an upbringing in a traditional Catholic rural family, he took over his parents' mountain farm business in 1962 and became well-known for his use of ecological farming, or permaculture, techniques at high altitudes ( after being unsuccessful with regular farming methods.

Holzer was called the "agricultural rebel" by the Austrian biologist Bernd Lötsch (de) because he persisted, despite being fined and even threatened with prison for practices such as not pruning his fruit trees.

Current work
, he was still conducting permaculture ("Holzer Permaculture") seminars both at his Krameterhof farm and worldwide, while continuing to work on his alpine farm.

He is author of several books, works nationally as permaculture-activist in the established agricultural industry, and works internationally as adviser for ecological agriculture.

He is the subject of the film The Agricultural Rebel, directed by Bertram Verhaag.

Bibliography 
 Sepp Holzer: The Rebel Farmer (2002)
 Sepp Holzer's Permaculture: A Practical Guide to Small-Scale, Integrative Farming and Gardening (2011)
 Desert or Paradise: Restoring Endangered Landscapes Using Water Management, Including Lake and Pond Construction (2012)

Filmography
 Permaculture Now! - Desert or Paradise? (2013)
 Sepp Holzer's Permaculture: 3 Films About Permaculture Farming (2015)

References

External links
Holzer Permaculture
Reuter News Service article
richsoil.com article Sepp Holzer's Permaculture

1942 births
Living people
Organic farmers
People involved with desert greening
Permaculturalists
Austrian farmers
Austrian agronomists